Corky's was a restaurant in Los Angeles, California's Sherman Oaks neighborhood. It was designed by Armet & Davis and built in 1958. It has a sweeping roofline characteristic of Googie architecture. It was remodeled in the 1970s and has been restored in recent years. It originally opened as Stanley Burke's Coffee Shop on Van Nuys Boulevard and became Corky's in the early 1960s as it transitioned to being open 24-7. Billy Joel played piano at the eatery in the 1970s. After 25 years as Corky's, it became the Lamplighter, and was used in 2010 as a filming location for A Nightmare on Elm Street. The restaurant is now restored and renovated as a renewed Corky's.

Corky’s closed for good December 14, 2019.

References

Googie architecture in California
Sherman Oaks, Los Angeles
1958 establishments in California
2019 disestablishments in California
Restaurants disestablished in 2019
Defunct restaurants in Los Angeles